Major League II is a 1994 American sports comedy film and sequel to the 1989 film Major League and it is the second installment in the Major League film series. The film stars most of the same cast from the original, including Charlie Sheen, Tom Berenger, and Corbin Bernsen. Absent from this film is Wesley Snipes, who played Willie Mays Hayes in the first film and who had become a film star in his own right by 1994. Omar Epps took over his role. Several new cast members appear in Major League II. David Keith plays Jack Parkman, a selfish superstar catcher who is looking to replace the aging Jake Taylor (Tom Berenger) as the starter. Takaaki Ishibashi, of Japanese comedic duo Tunnels, is outfielder Isuro "Kamikaze" Tanaka who helps excite the team. Eric Bruskotter is rookie catcher Rube Baker who is getting used to the MLB life. Unlike the first film, which was rated R, Major League II was rated PG and released by Warner Bros. instead of Paramount Pictures.

Plot

In the previous season, the Cleveland Indians won the division title by beating the New York Yankees in a one-game playoff, but were defeated in the ALCS by the Chicago White Sox.

The success of last season has changed the attitudes of the Indians. Pitching sensation Rick "Wild Thing" Vaughn has become a media sensation and is now more concerned about his public image than his pitching, causing him to lose the edge on his fastball. Instead, he begins to rely on highly ineffective breaking balls, to which he gives nicknames such as "Eliminator" and "Humiliator". Home run hitter Pedro Cerrano becomes a Buddhist and adopts a more placid, carefree style as opposed to the angry and aggressive player he was before. Center fielder Willie Mays Hayes has become a Hollywood actor and now fancies himself a power hitter, due to a sprained knee he suffered while shooting his new film, a box office flop. Aging catcher and team leader Jake Taylor has also returned, but once again is dealing with injuries to his knees.

Rachel Phelps, the owner who previously attempted to sabotage them last season, sells the team to Roger Dorn, who has retired as an active player to become the team owner. One of his first acts is to sign arrogant Oakland Athletics all-star catcher Jack Parkman, which forces Jake to compete for his old position. To further complicate things, minor-league catcher Rube Baker has also been invited to camp despite his inability to throw the ball back to the pitcher with any consistency. As the team breaks camp, manager Lou Brown informs Taylor that he is keeping him on as a coach rather than a player. Jake is upset at first but reluctantly accepts the position.

The Indians get off to a slow start, with various complications and conflicts between the players. Parkman quickly becomes a divisive figure in the clubhouse due to his ego, for which Lou suspends him after Parkman criticizes the team in the local papers. Parkman then informs Lou that the suspension is moot as he has been traded to the White Sox. Lou confronts Dorn for not consulting him about the trade. Dorn explains that he could no longer afford to pay Parkman's salary and had no choice but to trade him. In return, Japanese import Isuro "Kamikaze" Tanaka, a gifted left fielder with a penchant for crashing into the fence, is sent to the Indians.

Finally out of options, Dorn sells the Indians back to Rachel Phelps. Rachel keeps Dorn on as the Indians general manager and his first order of business is to re-activate himself as a player. Phelps bought the team back as revenge for ruining her plan to move the team to Miami. With the Indians now in last place, she has another chance to do so. Lou suffers a heart attack in the clubhouse due to his frustration over the team's performance and Jake takes over in his stead.

When Rube is hit by a pitch in his ankle during a doubleheader against the Boston Red Sox, Hayes is called upon to run for him but refuses to do so, which angers Jake. Vaughn quarrels with Hayes and the two begin fighting, which leads to the entire team fighting each other and getting ejected. After the game, Tanaka criticizes Cerrano for not having any "marbles" due to his struggles and Hayes makes a wisecrack at Baker about his injury, leading Rube to chastise Hayes and the rest of the team for their lack of passion. Inspired by the speech, Hayes volunteers to run for the injured Baker in the bottom of the ninth inning of the second game and promptly steals second, third and home to tie the score. Cerrano, also inspired, demands that Jake insert him into the game to pinch hit. As he bats, other players hold bags of marbles to help Cerrano who responds by hitting the game-winning home run.

The win sparks a hot streak that the Indians ride all the way to a second straight division title, clinched by beating the Toronto Blue Jays on the last day of the season. Despite this, Vaughn continues to slump as his ineffective breaking pitches have caused him to lose confidence in his best pitch, his fastball. To make matters worse, he refuses to finish games he starts and has allowed the heckling fans to get into his head.

In the ALCS, the Indians meet the White Sox again and win the first three games of the series. This inspires Rachel to give the team a phony pep talk before Game 4, which is purposely designed to get in the heads of the players and distract them. It works, as a still struggling Vaughn gives up a game-winning home run to Parkman in the bottom of the ninth. With strong offense by Parkman, the White Sox defeat the Indians in the next two games, forcing a seventh game in Cleveland. The night before the game, Jake goes to visit Vaughn at his home and tells him that he might be called on to pitch in relief in Game 7. Vaughn nonchalantly tells Taylor he will be ready. An infuriated Jake calls Vaughn out for having lost his edge and strongly advises him to find it again before the upcoming game.

The White Sox jump out to an early 2–1 lead in Game 7 after Parkman bowls over Rube on a play at the plate. With the Indians down by one, Hayes reaches base on a walk and taunts Parkman by saying he is going to score on the play without sliding. Rube then lines a drive to the left field corner and Hayes rounds the bases and heads for home. The ball gets to Parkman first, but Hayes leaps over Parkman and lands on home plate. Parkman responds, however, by hitting a three-run home run in the seventh inning and the White Sox take a 5–3 lead into the bottom of the eighth.

Although the Indians get a runner on, two quick outs are recorded and Jake is forced to make a strategic move. He calls upon Dorn to "take one for the team" and sends him up to pinch hit. Dorn takes the first pitch off his lower back and is pulled for a pinch runner. Cerrano steps in, having apparently reverted to his more placid self. After taking two pitches, Cerrano's teammates begin shaking little bags of marbles at him. With this, a refocused Cerrano hits a three-run homer to give the Indians a 6–5 lead.

However, the go-ahead runs reach base with two outs in the top of the ninth. Jake calls on Vaughn to get the final out and to the crowd's delight, Vaughn has taken Jake's message to heart and rediscovered his edge. To further this, he tells Jake that he intends to walk the current batter and pitch to Parkman instead, who is on deck. Knowing that an intentional walk will load the bases, Jake initially balks but takes confidence in Vaughn and allows him to face Parkman. Vaughn then strikes out Parkman, sending the Indians to the World Series.

Cast

 Charlie Sheen as Rick "Wild Thing" Vaughn
 Tom Berenger as Jake Taylor
 Corbin Bernsen as Roger Dorn
 Dennis Haysbert as Pedro Cerrano
 James Gammon as Lou Brown
 Omar Epps as Willie Mays Hayes
 Bob Uecker as Harry Doyle
 David Keith as Jack Parkman
 Takaaki Ishibashi as Isuro "Kamikaze" Tanaka
 Margaret Whitton as Rachel Phelps
 Eric Bruskotter as Rube Baker
 Alison Doody as Rebecca Flannery
 Michelle Burke as Nicki Reese
 Rene Russo as Lynn Wells
 Jay Leno as himself
 Randy Quaid as Johnny
 Richard Schiff as a commercial director
 Jesse Ventura as himself
 Steve Yeager as Coach Duke Temple
 Kevin Hickey as Schoup

Reception

Box office
The movie debuted at number 1 at the US box office, knocking out D2: The Mighty Ducks, another sports comedy featuring Major League star Charlie Sheen's brother, Emilio Estevez. In the United States and Canada, the movie grossed a total of $30,626,182 at the box office. Worldwide, it grossed $53.2 million.

Critical response
On Rotten Tomatoes the film holds an approval rating of 5% based on 21 reviews, with an average rating of 3.3/10. The site's critics consensus states: "Striking out on every joke, Major League II is a lazy sequel that belongs on the bench." Audiences polled by CinemaScore gave the film an average grade of "B" on an A+ to F scale.

In one of the lone positive reviews of the film, Rick Vanderknyff of Los Angeles Times wrote: "If that basic plot is at the core of just about every sports movie ever made, a slight variation often fuels their sequels. The team, spoiled by success, starts to get cocky, distracted by the temptations of fame, and loses sight of the things that made it a winner in the first place--only to regain its balance in time for the rousing big-game finale."

Year-end lists
 Dishonorable mention – Dan Craft, The Pantagraph

Sequel

David S. Ward announced in 2010 that he was working on a new film, which he called Major League 3, and hoped to cast the original stars Charlie Sheen, Wesley Snipes and Tom Berenger. The plot would have seen Sheen's character Ricky "Wild Thing" Vaughn coming out of retirement to work with a young player. The film was seen as the third film in the series, despite the fact that a third film, Major League: Back to the Minors, was released in 1998.

In 2011 in Cleveland, Ohio, Charlie Sheen during his "violent torpedoes of truth" tour announced to the audience that he was working on a third sequel, titled Major League 3, and said "We are gonna shoot it right here in Cleveland!" He opened the show wearing a "Rick Vaughn" #99 Cleveland Indians jersey.

In 2017, Morgan Creek announced plans to reboot their classic films from 1980s and 1990s as either television series or movies, following the success of The Exorcist television series. Several films in the early stages of development include film series Young Guns, Major League and Ace Ventura.

Notes
Cleveland Stadium was not used, just as it was not used in the first film. Oriole Park at Camden Yards in Baltimore replaced Milwaukee County Stadium as the stand-in for the team's home. Although Oriole Park bore a stronger resemblance to the stadium that the Indians were playing in when Major League II was released (the now-Progressive Field), like Milwaukee County Stadium in the first film it was used to represent Cleveland Stadium as the new ballpark was not yet named at the time of the filming. The outfield scoreboard at Oriole Park reads "Welcome to Cleveland Stadium" at various points and scenes in the outfield are played in front of a blue wall, which Cleveland Stadium had (Oriole Park and Progressive Field both have dark green outfield walls). In one scene, a sign for the "Sheraton Inner Harbor" can be seen above an outfielder's head. The Sheraton Inner Harbor is a hotel located in Baltimore's Inner Harbor, not Cleveland.

A year after this film was released, the actual Cleveland Indians team made it to the 1995 World Series, which was the team's first playoff appearance in 41 years. The Indians ended up losing in six games to the Atlanta Braves. In the lead-up to Game 3, the first World Series game played in Cleveland in 41 years, the public address system played "The House Is Rockin", the song from the end of Major League II. In another coincidence, Bob Uecker served as a commentator for the 1995 World Series television coverage on NBC, which shared broadcasting rights with rival network ABC, thanks to a strike that cancelled the final two months of the 1994 season, as well as the postseason and World Series. Two years after that, the Indians made it to the World Series again (also telecast by NBC and again with Uecker as a commentator) ended up with the same result, this time losing to the Florida Marlins in seven games. It would be 19 years before the Indians returned to the World Series (this time broadcast on Fox), which they would once again lose in seven games to the Chicago Cubs; this came a mere four months after the city's NBA team, the Cavaliers, had defeated the heavily-favored Golden State Warriors in the NBA Finals that also went seven games, and brought an end to a 52-year championship drought.

References

External links

 
 
 
 

1994 films
1990s sports comedy films
American baseball films
American sequel films
American sports comedy films
Cleveland Indians
Films set in Cleveland
Films shot in Baltimore
Films shot in Harrisburg, Pennsylvania
Warner Bros. films
Morgan Creek Productions films
Films scored by Michel Colombier
1994 comedy films
1990s English-language films
Films directed by David S. Ward
1990s American films
Films about Major League Baseball